is a Japanese former professional tennis player.

She has won eight singles titles and one doubles title on the ITF Women's Circuit. On 3 February 2020, she reached her best singles ranking of world No. 157. On 26 May 2014, she peaked at No. 378 in the WTA doubles rankings.

Hibi won her first $50k tournament at the 2013 FSP Gold River Women's Challenger, defeating Madison Brengle in straight sets in the final.

Grand Slam singles performance timeline

ITF Circuit finals

Singles: 13 (8 titles, 5 runner–ups)

Doubles: 4 (1 title, 3 runner–ups)

References

External links

 
 

1996 births
Living people
People from Toyonaka, Osaka
Japanese female tennis players
Tennis people from California
21st-century Japanese women